Studer is a Swiss surname. Notable people with the surname include:

Bernhard Studer (1794–1887), Swiss geologist
Bernhard Studer (painter) (1832–1868), Swiss painter
Cheryl Studer (born 1955), American operatic soprano
Emil Studer (born 1914), Swiss gymnast
Frédéric Studer (1926–2005), Swiss painter
Gottlieb Samuel Studer (1804–1890), Swiss mountaineer
Irvin Studer (1900–1970), Canadian politician
Jacob Henry Studer (1840–1904), American printer, lithographer, painter, ornithologist
Jürg Studer (born 1966), Swiss football defender
Jürg Studer (curler), Swiss curler in the 1980s
María Isabel Studer Noguez, Mexican academic in international relations, active since the 1990s
Noël Studer (born 1996), Swiss chess grandmaster
Quint Studer (born 1951), American health care consultant and philanthropist
Robert Studer (born 1912), Swiss field handball player
Rudi Studer (born 1951), German computer scientist
Samuel Emanuel Studer (1757–1834), Swiss malacologist
Sandra Studer (born 1969), Swiss singer who represented Switzerland in Eurovision Song Contest 1991 under the stage name of Sandra Simó
Sascha Studer (born 1991), Swiss football goalkeeper
Stefan Studer (born 1964), German football player
Stephan Studer (born 1975), Swiss football referee
Théophile Rudolphe Studer (1845–1922), Swiss ornithologist and marine biologist
Urs Studer, Swiss curler in the 1980s
Willi Studer (1912–1996), Swiss founder of the companies Revox and Studer